Sky Tower is a skyscraper in Wrocław, Poland. Construction began in December 2007 with the demolition of the 24-story Poltegor structure, until then the tallest building in the city. 
Sky Tower was the tallest building in Poland in the category of height to roof and category of highest floor until Varso Tower overtook it in mid-2020. A publicly accessible viewpoint is located on the 49th floor.

First design

The project is located on a property with an area of 27,362 square meters, located to the south of the center of Wrocław, approximately 2.5 km from the Main Square.

According to the initial architectural plans, Sky Tower would be a residential, office and commercial complex consisting of 7 buildings of various heights and with an aggregate surface area exceeding 260,000 square meters. One of the apartment buildings comprising Sky Tower was to be 258 m in height, including a spire (roof height at 221 m) and thus be the tallest residential building in Poland. The complex was to contain a parking facility with a capacity of over 2,000 cars. Completion of the Sky Tower project was originally slated for the second half of 2010.

Economic downturn
Like many construction sites around the world, Sky Tower was affected by the 2008 economic crisis, and construction of the tower ceased for a full year. In November 2009 an investor, one of the richest individuals in Poland, Leszek Czarnecki (shareholder Getin Holding SA), stated that the project would be redesigned with a lower overall height of 212 meters. Construction work resumed, and was expected to be complete by the end of 2012. 24 May 2012 saw the opening of a shopping center in the Sky Tower complex.

Gallery

See also
 List of tallest buildings in Poland
 List of tallest buildings in Europe

References

External links
Official webpage 
Architect's webpage 
Photo gallery Sky Tower construction, views from the top.
 

Buildings and structures in Wrocław
Shopping malls in Poland
Skyscraper office buildings in Poland
Residential skyscrapers in Poland
Skyscraper hotels in Poland
Commercial buildings completed in 2012
2012 establishments in Poland